Kishen Chand Law College or K. C. Law College is a private law school situated beside Akhnoor Road, Rajpura Chungi in Jammu in the Indian union territory of Jammu and Kashmir. It offers undergraduate 3 years law courses, 5 Year Integrated LL.B. courses, approved by Bar Council of India (BCI), New Delhi and affiliated to University of Jammu.

History
Shri Sudershan Mahajan founded the Kishen Chand Educational Society and in 2003, the Society established the law college at Jammu. The college is named after Kishen Chand Mahajan.

References

Educational institutions established in 2003
2003 establishments in Jammu and Kashmir
Education in Jammu (city)
Law schools in Jammu and Kashmir